Umakefeq is a genus of mites in the family Acaridae.

Species
 Umakefeq macroophtalmus Klimov, 2000
 Umakefeq mesoophtalmus Klimov, 2000
 Umakefeq microophtalmus Klimov, 2000

References

Acaridae